The 1995–96 Nationalliga A season was the 58th season of the Nationalliga A, the top level of ice hockey in Switzerland. 10 teams participated in the league, and EHC Kloten won the championship.

Regular season

Playoffs

Quarterfinals

Semifinals

Final

Playouts

External links
 Championnat de Suisse 1995/96 

1995–96 in Swiss ice hockey
Swiss